Moruga is a genus of Australian brushed trapdoor spiders first described by Robert J. Raven in 1994.

Species
 it contains eight species:
Moruga doddi Raven, 1994 — Australia (Queensland)
Moruga fuliginea (Thorell, 1881) — Australia (Queensland)
Moruga heatherae Raven, 1994 — Australia (Queensland)
Moruga insularis Raven, 1994 — Australia (Queensland)
Moruga kimberleyi Raven, 1994 — Australia (Western Australia)
Moruga thickthorni Raven, 1994 — Australia (Queensland)
Moruga thorsborneorum Raven, 1994 — Australia (Queensland)
Moruga wallaceae Raven, 1994 — Australia (Queensland)

References

Barychelidae
Mygalomorphae genera